C. africanum may refer to:
 Calliostoma africanum, a sea snail species
 Capnophyllum africanum, a flowering plant species  endemic to southern Africa
 Cyclamen africanum, the African cyclamen, a perennial plant species native to northern Algeria and Tunisia